Tyrannosaur Canyon is a novel by Douglas Preston published on August 11, 2005, by Forge Books. It is the first book in the Wyman Ford series. The story revolves around the search for a mysterious item buried in the New Mexico desert.

Plot summary
The novel opens with a lunar find by the Apollo 17 astronauts, which is suppressed.

Tom Broadbent (who first appeared in Preston's novel The Codex) is riding in the New Mexico desert when he hears gunshots coming from Tyrannosaur Canyon (a fictional canyon east of the Rio Chama Gorge, on Mesa Viejo, and north of the Monastery of Christ in the Desert). Following the sound, he comes upon an old prospector who has been shot by a sniper. He gives Tom a notebook just before he dies, and Tom rides off on his horse to find help. The murderer, Jimson Maddox, is furious that the notebook is gone by the time he reaches the body; he has been hired to retrieve it at any cost. He does, however, find an interesting rock sample. When Tom returns to Tyrannosaur Canyon with the police, the prospector's body has disappeared without a trace.

The notebook is filled with numbers, a code Tom is unable to decipher. He brings the book to Wyman Ford, a monk in training at a nearby monastery. Ford is a retired CIA analyst and he takes the notebook to try to decipher it. Ford discovers that the numbers are not a code but a sequence of ground-penetrating radar readings. When processed, they form the image of a fully intact Tyrannosaurus.

The rock sample Maddox found turns out to be a fragment of the Tyrannosaurus. Maddox's employer, Iain Corvus, a curator at the American Museum of Natural History, convinces a lab assistant, Melodie Crookshank, to examine the sample in secret. Corvus intends to steal her research, acquire a permit to excavate the Tyrannosaurus, and thus secure tenure at the museum, as well as wealth and fame.

Melodie discovers tiny particles within the sample which she calls "Venus particles". Upon making this discovery, Melodie calls Corvus to describe it to him, and the NSA hears the call. They initiate a black op led by J.G. Masago to cover up evidence of the particles, kill any witnesses, and retrieve the specimen.

Meanwhile, Ford goes into the desert to look for the dinosaur. At the same time, desperate to recover the notebook, Maddox kidnaps Tom Broadbent's wife, Sally. He takes her to an abandoned mine to use as a bargaining chip, forcing Tom to hand over the notebook. Now that Maddox has the notebook, however, he intends to kill Sally so he can not be identified. She manages to break free, Tom rescues her, and the two of them escape into the desert on foot, pursued by Maddox and his rifle.

Masago infiltrates the museum and kills Corvus, stealing the samples and his research. But Melodie, realizing previously that Corvus would try to steal the credit from her, had made copies of everything and hid them, along with more samples of the dinosaur. When she sees that he has been murdered and that his work is missing, she realizes she is the next likely target. Her only chance is to complete the research and post it to the Internet, so killing her would no longer serve the purposes of a cover-up. During her final research, she discovers that the 65-million-year-old Venus particles are still alive. They are a type of virus that destroys the cell structure of reptiles, evidently introduced to the earth by the Chicxulub meteorite. She posts her findings to the web to show the world.

Back in the desert, the black ops team has tracked Ford down, and Maddox is gaining on Tom and Sally. They manage to overpower Maddox and kill him, retrieving the notebook, and Ford leads them out of the canyon in an effort to evade the government assassins. Trapped in an old Anasazi cave, they discover the partially excavated Tyrannosaurus rex just before Masago's team converges on their location. Ford repeatedly reminds the team commander, Hitt, that Masago is ordering them to kill unarmed American civilians on American soil without first explaining to them why, which convinces Hitt and the rest of the team to turn on him. They then force Masago to tell them about the lethal Venus particles, which had also been found on the moon, thus establishing their extraterrestrial origin. As the entire team takes off in the helicopter, Masago breaks free and kills the pilot before being restrained by Ford and Broadbent. Despite the co-pilot's attempts, the helicopter crashes into a cliff. Though Tom and Sally manage to escape first and rather quickly, Tom heads back into the burning wreckage to save Ford and Hitt. With Sally's help, the four manage to get away just before the helicopter explodes, killing Masago, the co-pilot, and all of the other soldiers on board.

By the time they arrive with news about the dinosaur's location, Melodie's research has spread across the Internet. All those involved are made famous, including Robbie Weathers, the old prospector's daughter. The Smithsonian Institution funds a program to research the Venus particles and the dinosaur itself, which is christened by Robbie and named after her. At the reception, Ford makes an off-hand remark where he speculates that the particles may have been intentionally developed by an alien race, so as to destroy the dinosaurs and allow humans to begin their evolution.

Timeline
The events in this novel follow the events in The Codex and predate the events in Blasphemy.
Tom Broadbent and Sally Broadbent (formerly Sally Colorado) return from the previous novel, while the characters of Maxwell, Philip, and Vernon Broadbent (Tom's father and brothers, respectively), as well as the events of The Codex in general, are repeatedly hinted at earlier in the novel.
This book marks the first appearance of Wyman Ford, who subsequently serves as the main protagonist of Preston's solo works.

References

American thriller novels
Techno-thriller novels
Novels about dinosaurs
Novels by Douglas Preston
2005 American novels
Novels set in New Mexico
Forge Books books